House style may refer to:
 Standards for writing as specified in the internal style guide of a particular institution, for example, a book publishing company, newspaper, professional organization, or university
 Standards for illustration or graphic design, as an aspect of corporate or organizational identity, or as used for the overall output of a comic book publisher or animation studio
 Types of residential structures (see List of house styles)

See also 
 House organ